Robert Wilson (born 13 September 1954) is a Canadian bobsledder. He competed at the 1980 Winter Olympics and the 1984 Winter Olympics.

References

1954 births
Living people
Canadian male bobsledders
Olympic bobsledders of Canada
Bobsledders at the 1980 Winter Olympics
Bobsledders at the 1984 Winter Olympics
Sportspeople from Montreal